The Puerto Rico women's national under-18 volleyball team represents Puerto Rico in international women's volleyball competitions and friendly matches under the age 18 and it is ruled by the Puerto Rican Volleyball Federation That Follow the North, Central America and Caribbean Volleyball Confederation NORCECA and also is a part of The Federation of International Volleyball FIVB.

Results

Summer Youth Olympics
 Champions   Runners up   Third place   Fourth place

FIVB U18 World Championship
 Champions   Runners up   Third place   Fourth place

NORCECA Girls' U18 Championship
 Champions   Runners up   Third place   Fourth place

Pan-American U18 Cup
 Champions   Runners up   Third place   Fourth place

Team

Current squad

The following is the Puerto Rican roster in the 2019 Girls' Youth Pan-American Volleyball Cup.

Head Coach:  Juan Rodriguez

References

External links
Official website 
FIVB profile

National women's under-18 volleyball teams
Volleyball in Puerto Rico
Volleyball